Menka may be,

Menka language
Orestis Menka
Menka (queen)